Roberto Fugazot (1902–1971) was a Uruguayan tango singer and film actor. Fugazot appeared in eighteen films including Savage Pampas (1945). He was the father of Diana Cortesina. He was married to the actress María Esther Gamas, with whom he had a daughter María Rosa Fugazot who also became an actress.

Selected filmography
 Savage Pampas (1945)

References

Bibliography 
 Finkielman, Jorge. The Film Industry in Argentina: An Illustrated Cultural History. McFarland, 24 Dec 2003.

External links 
 

1902 births
1971 deaths
Uruguayan male film actors
20th-century Uruguayan male singers
Singers from Montevideo
Burials at La Chacarita Cemetery
20th-century Uruguayan male actors
Male actors from Montevideo